Salford Civic Centre, formerly Swinton and Pendlebury Town Hall, is a municipal building at Chorley Road, in Swinton, Greater Manchester, England. It is the administrative headquarters of Salford City Council.

History
The Swinton and Pendlebury Urban District Council, which had been formed in 1894, had used Victoria House in Victoria Park as their meeting place. However, after the council became a municipal borough in 1934, it decided to seek larger premises.

The site selected on Chorley Road in Swinton had previously been occupied by Swinton Industrial School. The foundation stone for the new town hall was laid by the mayor on 17 October 1936. The new building was designed by architects Percy Thomas and Ernest Prestwich in the neo-classical style after they had won a national design competition. It was built by J. Gerrard and Sons at a cost of £80,000 and officially opened by the Deputy Leader of the Labour Party, Arthur Greenwood MP, on 17 September 1938. The most striking feature of the design was the clock tower,  in height, with clock faces on each side,  in diameter. Percy Thomas was awarded the Royal Institute of British Architects (RIBA) Gold Medal for his work in 1939.

A glass-walled computer centre was built to the south-east of the town hall, in order to cope with increased administration requirements, and completed in July 1973. Following the implementation of the Local Government Act 1972, Swinton and Pendlebury Town Hall, being one of the most modern town halls in the enlarged local authority area, became the meeting place of the enlarged local authority, known as the Salford City Council, in 1974. The council chamber was re-modelled at that time so that it was capable of accommodating a larger number of councillors.

A four-story extension located to the south-west of the town hall, which was designed by Cruickshank and Sewards and built by Fairclough Fram Gerrard, was inspected by the Duke of Edinburgh during construction and completed in the late 1970s. The City Treasury Building, also known as "Unity House", was built by John Laing Group and officially opened by the Shadow Chief Secretary to the Treasury, Margaret Beckett MP, on 9 October 1991.

Following the closure of Kingslea House on Barton Road in 2007, the East Wing of the civic centre became the local register office and as well a venue for weddings and civil partnerships.

In July 2020, during the COVID-19 pandemic, a mural depicting Salford's key workers, which had been painted by an anonymous artist, was left on the steps of the civic centre: council officials decided that it would be put on public display.

Notes

References

External links

Salford Civic Centre

Government buildings completed in 1938
Local government in Salford
Buildings and structures in the City of Salford
City and town halls in Greater Manchester
Swinton, Greater Manchester